Oulad Aissa, Tunisia is a place in Tunisia, North Africa that is located at 36°32'12.0"N 10°13'35.0"E. It is north of Zagouan, and 20 km south of Tunis. The area is mountainous.

References 

Populated places in Tunisia